The Koli people (Hindi: कोली) are a community native to India and Pakistan. The Koli forms the largest caste-cluster, comprising 24% of the total population of the Gujarat and 30% of Himachal Pradesh. The following is the list of notable Kolis.

Military

Navy 

 Kanhoji Angre, Admiral of Maratha Navy
 Yakut Khan, Admiral of Mughal Navy
 Laya Patil, Naval chief in Maratha Navy
 Ram Patil, Admiral of Ahmednagar Sultanate navy
 Chempil Arayan, Admiral of Travancore Kingdom navy

Army 

 Tanaji Malusare, military general of Maratha Army

Politics

Chief ministers 
 Madhav Singh Solanki, former Chief Minister of Gujarat

Party presidents 
 Bharti Shiyal, National Vice President of Bhartiya Janata Party, Member of Parliament from Bhavnagar

Ministers 
 Parshottambhai Solanki, Fishery Minister of Gujarat

Members of Parliament 
 Hukam Chand Kachwai, five times Member of Parliament from Madhya Pradesh loksabha
 Ajitsinh Dabhi, Member of Parliament from Kheda and son of Fulsinh Dabhi Koli
 Anant Tare, was senior leader of Shiv Sena, former Mayor of Thane and Member of legislative council of Maharashtra
 Gigabhai Gohil, was Member of Parliament for Bhavnagar
 Pratap Shivram Singh, member of 3rd, 4th and 5th Lok Sabha, retired Junior Commissioned officer of British Indian Army and President of Akhil Bharatiya Kshatriya Koli Mahasabha
 Mohanbhai Patel, Member of Parliament from Junagadh constituency

Revolutionaries and freedom fighters 

 Khemirao Sarnaik, challenged the Mughal Sultan Aurangzeb and dismissed the Jiziya
 Jhalkaribai, rebel leader of the Indian rebellion of 1857
 Rooplo Kolhi, hero of Indian Independence movement
 Govindas Ramdas, led the kolis against British rule in Gujarat since 1826 to 1830
 Govind Rao Khare, Subedar of Ratangarh fort in Maratha Army later revolted against British rule after the defeat of Maratha Empire in 1840

Rulers 

 Yashwantrao Mukne, Maharaja of Jawhar State
 Zalim Jalia, chief of the Dahewan
 Nag Nayak, Rana of Sinhagad fort who defended the fort for eight months from Muhammad bin Tughluq

Religion 

 Bapu Velnath Thakor, saint from Gujarat
 Kanua Baba, a Koli saint of Uttar Pradesh followed by Hindus and Muslims
 Kuber Das, koli sant of Gujarat devoted by Luhars

See also 
 Koli piracy in India
 Koli rebellions
 List of Koli states and clans
 Koli Dance
 Koli language

References 

Koli people
Koli princely states
Koli clans
Koli titles